Navalafuente is a municipality of the Community of Madrid, Spain. The municipality covers an area of 11.75  km2. It lies at 909 metres above sea level. , it has a population of 1,397.

Bus 

 726: Navalafuente - Guadalix - Madrid (Plaza de Castilla)

References 

Municipalities in the Community of Madrid